There are 39 species of amphibians of Italy (including introduced and naturalised species) in two orders; no Caecilian is known to live in the country. 

They are listed here by family.

Anura

Ranidae
Bullfrog, Lithobathes catesbeiana (introduced)
Pool frog, Pelophylax lessonae
Italian pool frog, Pelophylax bergeri
Marsh frog, Pelophylax ridibunda 
Agile frog, Rana dalmatina 
Italian stream frog, Rana italica (endemic)
Italian agile frog, Rana latastei
Perez's frog, Rana perezi
Common frog, Rana temporaria

Discoglossidae
Mediterranean painted frog, Discoglossus pictus
Tyrrhenian painted frog, Discoglossus sardus

Bombinatoridae
Yellow-bellied toad, Bombina variegata
Apennine yellow-bellied toad, Bombina pachypus (endemic)

Hylidae
European tree frog, Hyla arborea
Italian tree frog, Hyla intermedia
Mediterranean tree frog, Hyla meridionalis
Sardinian tree frog, Hyla sarda

Bufonidae
Common toad or European toad, Bufo bufo
European green toad, Bufo viridis 
Balearic green toad, Bufo balearicus
Sicilian green toad, Bufo siculus (endemic)

Pelobatidae
Common spadefoot, Pelobates fuscus

Pelodytidae
Common parsley frog, Pelodytes punctatus

Caudata

Salamandridae
Sardinian brook salamander, Euproctus platycephalus (endemic)
Alpine salamander, Salamandra atra
Lanza's alpine salamander, Salamandra lanzai
Fire salamander, Salamandra salamandra
Spectacled salamander, Salamandrina terdigitata (endemic)
Italian crested newt, Triturus carnifex
Smooth newt, Lissotriton vulgaris
Alpine newt, Ichthyosaura alpestris

Plethodontidae
Strinati's cave salamander, Speleomantes strinatii
Sarrabus' cave salamander, Speleomantes sarrabusensis (endemic)
Ambrosi's cave salamander, Speleomantes ambrosii (endemic)
Monte Albo cave salamander, Speleomantes flavus (endemic)
Imperial cave salamander, Speleomantes imperialis (endemic)
Italian cave salamander, Speleomantes italicus (endemic)
Supramonte cave salamander, Speleomantes supramontis (endemic)

Proteidae
Olm, Proteus anguinus

References

Italy
Italy
Amphibians
Amphibians